Brother Brat is a 1944 Warner Bros. Looney Tunes theatrical cartoon short, directed by Frank Tashlin. The short was released on July 15, 1944, and stars Porky Pig.

Plot 
When a mother goes to work in a factory during World War II, Porky Pig is hired to baby-sit. He quickly finds out that the baby is a violent-tempered infant. He tries to use a child psychology book to control the baby, to no avail. Eventually, the mother returns and uses the book to discipline the baby—by spanking.

References

External links 
 

Looney Tunes shorts
Warner Bros. Cartoons animated short films
1944 films
1944 animated films
Short films directed by Frank Tashlin
American World War II propaganda shorts
Fiction about child care occupations
Films about babies
Porky Pig films
Films produced by Leon Schlesinger
Films scored by Carl Stalling
Films set in 1944
1940s Warner Bros. animated short films